Mr. Azaad is a 1994 Indian Hindi-language film directed by T. Rama Rao and produced by Vishal Nihalani. The film stars Anil Kapoor and Chandni. It is a remake of the Tamil film Ulle Veliye (1993).

Description 
Azaad, an orphan, takes to petty crime and acts like a modern-day Robin Hood. However, the death of an honest constable causes him to take stock of his actions

Cast

 Anil Kapoor as Azaad
 Chandni as Roopa
 Niki Aneja as Inspector Shalu
 Raj Babbar as Union Leader Satyaprakash Azaad Father
 Deepti Naval as satyaprakash wife azaad mother
 Shakti Kapoor as Garg
 Ishrat Ali as Katkar
 Kader Khan as Hiravat Mishra
 Arjun as Hiravat's Son
 Raza Murad as Police Commissioner
 Mahavir Shah as Police Inspector D.Lal
 Alok Nath as Police Constable Hari Dada
 Rakesh Bedi as Police Constable Khote
 Harish Patel as Police Constable  Khare
 Yunus Parvez as Village Zamindar
 Sudhir
Mac Mohan
Johnny Lever
Raju Srivastav
Sulabha Deshpande
Sulabha Arya
Girija Shankar as Police Inspector

Soundtrack

External links

1990s Hindi-language films
1994 films
Films directed by T. Rama Rao
Films scored by Bappi Lahiri
Hindi remakes of Tamil films